Veselovka is a rural locality (a village) in Tryapinsky Selsoviet, Aurgazinsky District, Bashkortostan, Russia. The population was 77 as of 2010. There are 2 streets.

Geography 
Veselovka is located 24 km east of Tolbazy (the district's administrative centre) by road. Tolmachevka is the nearest rural locality.

References 

Rural localities in Aurgazinsky District